Dandamudi Rajagopal Rao  (14 October – 6 August ) was an Indian Asian Games Medallist, Olympic Weightlifter, Bodybuilder, Film Actor, Sports Administrator and Coach.

Sports achievements

In 1946, he won 1st place in XII Olympic Sports Event of India held in Bangalore for the Heavyweight class

He annexed Kerala title in 1942 and the Bombay provincial honours in 1944 breaking all the previous records.

He has represented India in International competitions held in Burma in 1947.

He won Gold medal in Indian Olympic Sports Event held at Delhi in 1952. He has lifted 780 pounds in the Heavyweight Category.

In 1954 Indian Olympic Sports Event he won Gold medal again and established three records.

He won Bronze medal in 1951 Asian Games held in New Delhi in Weightlifting which was one of the best performances of an Indian athlete considering the strong competition in the field and the number of countries participating

Dandamudi was the 1st Indian Weightlifting Champion and held the title continuously for 13 years from 1945 to 1958. Dandamudi won Mr. Asia title in 1948 at Calcutta in Asian bodybuilding competition.

He was the 1st President of Andhra Olympic Association. He has been the captain of Andhra Olympic team. He was the Founder of Andhra Olympic Association  and several other important sports associations in Andhra Pradesh which helped in upliftment of sports in the state and in India as well.

He represented India thrice in the Olympic Games in the Heavyweight Category of Weightlifting; First in London Games in 1948, Second in Finland Games in 1952 and Last in Melbourne Games in 1956.

He finished 16th in London Games, 9th in Melbourne Games and 6th in Finland which was his best performance in the Premier Sporting Exhibition in the World.

He established Free Gymnasia by the name of D.R. Gopal Institute at locations at Krishna District to coach youngsters. He also participated in the institute as a coach and mentor proving his multi-talented ability and service to the sport

Honours & Popularity

Dandamudi was conferred with various titles  namely  Mr. Asia, Andhra Bhima, Andhra Hercules, Indian Tarzan and The Giant of India. Dandamudi's feats attracted people from all over the country. One of his notable, dangerous and jaw dropping feats of strength which drew huge crowds were displays, especially the main event where he would break iron chains around his body, by taking a deep breath and flexing his muscles. Dandamudi was the 1st Indian who has received Mr. Asia title. Arjuna award winner Kamineni Eswararao was trained by Dandamudi in Weightlifting

Film career

Dandamudi has acted in several films. The most notable performance was in Nartanasala (1963), wherein he portrayed the role of Bheema. He also acted in Bhimanjaneya Yuddham, Veeraabhimanyu. In his short stint in the silver screen, Dandamudi acted alongside stalwarts like N. T. Rama Rao, Savitri, Shoban Babu, S. V. Ranga Rao, Kanta Rao, Mukkamala and Mikkilineni.

Personal life

He was born in Gandigunta village, Krishna district to a family of farmers. Impressed by the legendary Indian bodybuilder Kodi Rammurthy Naidu, he took up the sport of weightlifting. He was trained by Sistla Somayajulu in weightlifting for some time. Later he traveled with Kolli Rangadasu and gave many performances in different Indian states and countries.

Rajagopal was married to Mrs. Anasuya. The couple had 5 children - 3sons and 2 Daughters,  Jhansi Lakshmi  (Gudivada), Dr.D.P. Rao (Maxivision Hospitals ), Dr.Shyam  (USA), Basavaraj ( Vijayawada), Vijaylakshmi ( GANDIGUNTA).

He died on 6 August . An indoor stadium, Dandamudi Rajagopal Rao Indoor Stadium, 1.5 Acres was donated by him & named after him for his immense contribution and to immortalize in his memory at Benz Circle Vijayawada. The stadium was inaugurated by then Chief Minister of Andhra Pradesh Tanguturi Anjaiah Garu .

References

Telugu people

Indian male weightlifters
Olympic weightlifters of India
Weightlifters at the 1948 Summer Olympics
Weightlifters at the 1956 Summer Olympics
Asian Games medalists in weightlifting
Weightlifters at the 1951 Asian Games
People from Krishna district
Weightlifters from Karnataka
Medalists at the 1951 Asian Games
Asian Games bronze medalists for India